Parliamentary elections were held in Poland on 21 September 1997. In the Sejm elections, 47.93% of citizens cast their votes, 96.12% of which were counted as valid. In the Senate elections, 46.92% of citizens cast their votes, 97.82% of which were valid.

The elections were won by the liberal conservative party Solidarity Electoral Action only to lead to a coalition forming with the Freedom Union, another liberal party. The elections were a major setback for the Democratic Left Alliance and the Polish People's Party, which were forced out of government.

Opinion polls

Results

Sejm

By constituency

Senate

References

Obwieszczenie Państwowej Komisji Wyborczej z dn. 25 IX 1997 r., Monitor Polski. Nr 64, poz. 620
Obwieszczenie PKW z dn. 25 IX 1997 r., M.P. Nr 64, poz. 621

Poland
Parliamentary elections in Poland
History of Poland (1989–present)
1997 elections in Poland
September 1997 events in Europe